"Never Understand" is the first single from the Scottish alternative rock band The Jesus and Mary Chain's debut album Psychocandy. It was the band's first release on Blanco y Negro Records and was released through them in February 1985. The song was written by William Reid and Jim Reid, and was produced by The Jesus and Mary Chain.  It is considered influential for its use of guitar feedback.

Chart performance
The single reached number 47 on the UK Singles Chart.

Critical reception 
The song was ranked number 1 among the "Tracks of the Year" for 1985 by NME.

Track listing
All tracks written by Jim Reid and William Reid, except where noted.

7" (NEG 8)
"Never Understand" – 2:54
"Suck" – 2:07

12" (NEG 8T)
"Never Understand" – 2:54
"Suck" – 2:07
"Ambition" (Vic Godard) – 3:31

Personnel

The Jesus and Mary Chain
Jim Reid – vocals, producer
William Reid – guitar, producer
Douglas Hart – bass, producer
Bobby Gillespie – drums, producer

References

External links
Lyrics at MTV.com

The Jesus and Mary Chain songs
1985 singles
Songs written by Jim Reid
Songs written by William Reid (musician)
1985 songs
Blanco y Negro Records singles
Pop punk songs